Rzyszczewko may refer to the following places:
Rzyszczewko, Koszalin County in West Pomeranian Voivodeship (north-west Poland)
Rzyszczewko, Sławno County in West Pomeranian Voivodeship (north-west Poland)
Rzyszczewko, Szczecinek County in West Pomeranian Voivodeship (north-west Poland)